The Vine Inn is a public house at Vine Hill, Pamphill, Dorset BH21 4EE.

It is on the Campaign for Real Ale's National Inventory of Historic Pub Interiors.

It was a bakery until about 1900, when it was refitted as a pub. It is owned by the National Trust.

References

National Inventory Pubs
Pubs in Dorset